Earl Baker (March 22, 1925 – September 30, 1999) was an American football and track and field coach.  He was the 11th head football coach at Northwest Missouri State University in Maryville, Missouri, serving for three seasons, from 1960 to 1962, and compiling a record of 7–20.  Baker was also the head track and field coach at Northwest Missouri State from 1962 to 1973.  He died at the age of 74, on September 30, 1999, at his home in Maryville.

Head coaching record

Football

References

1925 births
1999 deaths
American football guards
Missouri Valley Vikings football players
Northwest Missouri State Bearcats football coaches
College track and field coaches in the United States